Charles Wells Russell Jr. (1856 – 1927) was an American diplomat.

Biography 
Russell was born in 1856 to prominent politician and lawyer Charles Wells Russell Sr.

Originally, Russell worked as an attorney for the Department of Justice (DOJ). He would also marry both of the sisters of former Confederate Colonel, John S. Mosby and by the late 1800s have children from them both. Russell would use his position in the DOJ to higher his brother-in-law as a subordinate in the Bureau of Insular and Territorial affairs.

Russell served as the United States' Envoy Extraordinary and Minister Plenipotentiary to Iran from 1909 to 1914.

In 1917 Russell would be listed as the editor on his brother-in-law's memoirs.

Russell died in 1927.

References 

1856 births
1927 deaths

19th-century American lawyers
20th-century American lawyers
Ambassadors of the United States to Iran
20th-century American diplomats